The ProB is the third-tier level league of professional club basketball in Germany. The league comprises 24 teams, separated into a Northern and a Southern Division. Officially, the ProB is part of the 2. Basketball Bundesliga, which consists of the two hierarchical leagues ProA and ProB. Before the 2007–08 season, the 2. Basketball Bundesliga was a basketball league with the same name, which consisted of two geographical divisions. At the end of the league stage, the winning team of the playoffs in each division, qualify for the ProA, and the teams positioned in 9th place and lower, fight in the play-downs, for the whereabouts in the league. The last two placed teams of both divisions are relegated to the lower level fourth-tier league (1.Regionalliga).

Current teams (2022-23)

North

South

Champions

Performances by club

References 

 
2. Basketball Bundesliga
Basketball leagues in Germany
Germany
Professional sports leagues in Germany